Paul Anthony Taliaferro (August 30, 1934 – February 1, 2013) was an American politician. He served as a Democratic member for the 31st district of the Oklahoma Senate.

Life and career 
Taliaferro was born in Lawton, Oklahoma, the son of Alice Margaret Howard and Jim Taliaferro.

In 1976, he was elected to represent the 31st district of the Oklahoma Senate, succeeding his father who died while in office. Taliaferro was the Senate Whip for the Oklahoma Senate.

In 1991, Taliaferro was found guilty of bank fraud by a federal jury. The case resulted in his being suspended of the Oklahoma Senate. While he was suspended, Taliaferro was succeeded by Sam Helton in a special election.

Taliaferro served as a member of the Lawton Rangers.

Taliaferro died in February 2013 at his home in Lawton, Oklahoma, at the age of 78.

References 

1934 births
2013 deaths
People from Lawton, Oklahoma
Democratic Party Oklahoma state senators
20th-century American politicians